The Kybeyan River, a watercourse that is part of the Murrumbidgee catchment within the Murray–Darling basin, is located in the Monaro region of New South Wales, Australia.

The river rises on the western slopes of the Great Dividing Range, near Greenland Swamp, and flows generally north and north-west, joined by three tributaries before reaching its confluence with the Numeralla River, near Warrens Corner; descending  over its  course.

See also

 List of rivers of New South Wales (A–K)
 List of rivers of Australia

References

Rivers of New South Wales
Murray-Darling basin